The 2006 elections for the Pennsylvania House of Representatives were held on November 7, 2006, with all districts being contested. Necessary primary elections were held on May 16, 2006. Members elected in 2006 were inaugurated on January 2, 2007. State Representatives are elected for two-year terms, with the entire House of Representatives up for a vote every two years.

While initial results of the elections showed the Republicans holding onto a one-seat majority in the state house, the race in the 156th district in Chester County had only 19 votes separating the candidates. A further count of provisional ballots and absentee ballots gave the Democrats a victory in the 156th district by 23 votes. A recount proved decisive in the Democrats' favor with the margin increasing to 28 votes.  This turned control of the state house to the Democrats for the first time since 1994.

As a further note, the pay raise scandal claimed one more high-level victim as Rep. Mike Veon, the Democratic Whip, was defeated for re-election.

Make-Up of the House

General election

See also
Pennsylvania Senate elections, 2006

References

External links
 
 
 

2006 Pennsylvania elections
2006
Pennsylvania House of Representatives